ACFTA may refer to:
African Continental Free Trade Area (AfCFTA)
ASEAN–China Free Trade Area (ACFTA)